The Turkvision Song Contest 2014 was the second edition of the Turkvision Song Contest, which took place in Kazan in the region of Tatarstan. Twenty-four Turkic regions, which have either a large Turkic population or a widely spoken Turkic language, confirmed their participation, making it the largest contest exceeding the participation number for the  whereas four European countries (and ) made their debut. The semi final took place on 19 November 2014  and the final took place on 21 November 2014. The presenters of the contest were Artem Shalimov, Narmin Agaeva, and Ranil Nuriov.

Location

On 15 October 2013, it was announced that the hosts for Turkvision 2014 will be Kazan, Tatarstan.  Kazan is the capital and largest city of the Republic of Tatarstan, Russia. With a population of 1,143,535, it is the eighth most populous city in Russia. Kazan lies at the confluence of the Volga and Kazanka Rivers in European Russia.

The TatNeft Arena, an indoor sporting arena, was chosen as the host venue for the 2014 contest. The capacity of the arena is 10,000 and was opened in 2005. The arena is home to Ak Bars Kazan of the Kontinental Hockey League.

Format
The contest consisted of a semi-final held on 19 November 2014, and a grand final which took place on the evening of 21 November 2014. Twenty-five participating regions took part in the semi-final, of which twelve were to qualify and proceeded to the grand final.

National host broadcaster
Maydan Television (MTV) was the host broadcaster for the 2014 contest.

Participating countries and regions

Returning artists
Zhanikaev's previous entry was entitled "Adamdi Bizni Atibiz" (His name is Adam), while Tuzlu's last entry was entitled "Kerkük'ten Yola Çikak" (Out from Kirkuk).

Semi-final
The semi-final took place at the TatNeft Arena at 19:00 MSK on 19 November 2014.

Final
The Final took place at the TatNeft Arena at 19:00 MSK on 21 November 2014.

Scoreboard

Semi-final

10 points 
Below is a summary of the maximum 10 points each country awarded to another in the semifinal:

Final

10 points 
Below is a summary of the maximum 10 points each country awarded to another in the final:

Incidents

Funda Kılıç outfit
Following the semi-final, it was reported that  had come under criticism from a number of delegations for performing in shorts. The head of delegation for Bashkortostan stated that it was outrageous for Kılıç to be wearing the shorts in front of 300 million viewers. Kılıç did however have the support of the contest organisers. In the final, Kılıç did not opt to wear the same outfit as in the semi-final.

International broadcasts and voting

National jury members
Each participating country was represented by one jury member. Confirmed as being on the jury were:

  – Avni Qahili
  – Eldar Gasimov
  – Aigul Akhmadeeva
  – Ahmed Švrakić
  – Seyran Mambetov
  – Afik Novruzov
  – Volkan Gucer
  – Javat Abrahem
  – Fethullah Ahmed Salih
  – Nadezhda Hadzhieva
  – Bolat Mazhagulov
  – Gulnur Satylganova
  – Eran Hasip
  Moscow – Arman Davletyarov
  – Dina Garipova
  – Sinan Akçıl
  – Atageldi Garyagdyyew
  – Mansur Tashmatov
  Yakutia – Vladimir Indigirsky

Commentators

Each participating broadcaster is expected to show the contest live enabling the public to vote in the contest. The broadcasters that have been confirmed so far are:

  – ATV Azerbaijan
  – Kurai Television
  – Hayat TV
  – Crimea Public Radio and Television
  – GRT Television
  – Marmueli Television
  – Türkshow
  – IRIB
  – Turkmenli Television
  – Timur Serzhanov and Arman Duisenov (Adam Media Group)
  – Arhiz 24
  – RTV
  – KTRK
  – MRT 2
  – Kibris Genc Television (non-participating)
  – GTRK Omsk (non-participating)
  – Alpha Media TV
  – TMB Russia – Your World East (non-participating)
  – Maydan Television
  – TMB TV
  – ODTRK Odessa

Other regions

 – The region of Northern Cyprus had initially selected İpek Amber to represent them with the song "Sessiz gidiş" (Silent leaving).  But it was later announced that it was highly likely they would have to withdraw due to political technicalities.  The singer was to enter Tatarstan using a Northern Cypriot passport. However, due to the Cyprus dispute, the International recognition of Northern Cyprus as a self-declared state is not recognised by Russia, thus denying entry into Tatarstan, a federal subject of Russia.

References

External links
 
 

2014 in Russia
Turkish music
Turkvision Song Contest by year
Kazan
2014 song contests
November 2014 events in Turkey